Ronnie Scott's Jazz Club is a jazz club that has operated in Soho, London, since 1959.

History

The club opened on 30 October 1959 in a basement at 39 Gerrard Street in London's Soho district. It was set up and managed by musicians Ronnie Scott and Pete King. In 1965 it moved to a larger venue nearby at 47 Frith Street. The original venue continued in operation as the "Old Place" until the lease ran out in 1967, and was used for performances by the up-and-coming generation of musicians.

Zoot Sims was the club's first transatlantic visitor in 1962, and was succeeded by many others (often saxophonists whom Scott and King, tenor saxophonists themselves, admired, such as Johnny Griffin, Lee Konitz, Sonny Rollins and Sonny Stitt) in the years that followed. Many UK jazz musicians were also regularly featured, including Tubby Hayes and Dick Morrissey who would both drop in for jam sessions with the visiting stars. In the mid-1960s, Ernest Ranglin was the house guitarist. The club's house pianist until 1967 was Stan Tracey. For nearly 30 years it was home of a Christmas residency to George Melly and John Chilton's Feetwarmers. In 1978, the club established the label Ronnie Scott's Jazz House, which issued both live performances from the club and new recordings.

Scott regularly acted as the club's Master of Ceremonies, and was known for his repertoire of jokes, asides and one-liners. After Scott's death in 1996, King continued to run the club for a further nine years, before selling the club to theatre impresario Sally Greene and philanthropist Michael Watt in June 2005.

In 2009, Ronnie Scott's was named by the Brecon Jazz Festival as one of 12 venues that had made the most important contributions to jazz in the United Kingdom, and finished third in the voting for the initial award.

Jimi Hendrix's last public performance was at Ronnie Scott's, in 1970.

House musicians

Many of the visiting musicians appearing at Ronnie Scott's were soloists touring without their own rhythm section, or were touring as members of larger bands and they often used the house band to accompany them. On occasions, the house musicians coincided with the members of the various bands that Ronnie Scott led at one time or another.

Drums
 Phil Seamen – house drummer from 1964 to 1968
 Allan Ganley – house drummer from 1964 to 1967, 
backing visiting Americans such as Stan Getz, Art Farmer and Roland Kirk
 Tony Oxley – house drummer from 1966 until the early 1970s. 
Accompanied Joe Henderson, Lee Konitz, Charlie Mariano, Stan Getz, Sonny Rollins and Bill Evans.
 Martin Drew – house drummer from 1975 to 1995
 Mark Fletcher - house drummer from 1994 to 2006
 Chris Dagley – house drummer from 2006 to 2010
 Pedro Segundo – house drummer since 2010
 Chris Higginbottom – house drummer since 2012

Keyboards
 Eddie Thompson – house pianist 1959–60
 Stan Tracey – house pianist from March 1960 to 1967/1968
 John Critchinson – house pianist from 1978 to 1995. 
Accompanied Chet Baker, George Coleman, James Moody, Joe Henderson and Johnny Griffin
 James Pearson – house pianist since 2006

Bass
 Sam Burgess – house bassist since 2006

Other instruments
 Ernest Ranglin – house guitarist 1964–65.

Other musicians
Other regular performers since 2006 include:

 Al Cherry (guitar)
 Alan Barnes  (sax)
 Alec Dankworth
 Alex Garnett (sax)
 Alistair White  (trombone)
 Arnie Somogyi (bass)
 Dave O'Higgins
 Gary Baldwin (Hammond organ)
 Gerard Presencer (trumpet)
 James Nisbet (guitar)
 Mark Smith (bass)
 Matt Home (drums)
 Mornington Lockett
 Natalie Williams (vocals)
 Nina Ferro
 Pete Long (sax)
 Ralph Salmins (drums)
 Steve Fishwick
 Steve Rushton (drums)

Record label
In 1978, the club established its own record label, Ronnie Scott's Jazz House. The first release was an album by Scott's quintet. Over the next 20 years, the label gained in prominence, issuing both historic live club performances and new recordings.

Live albums recorded at Ronnie's
 1963–65: Live in London vols 1 & 2 – Tubby Hayes (taped by Les Tomkins at the Old Place)
 1964: Live at Ronnie Scott's – Ben Webster
 1964: The Punch – Ben Webster
 1964/65: There and Back – The Dick Morrissey Quartet (released 1997). Recorded 27 January 1964/20 August 1965
 1965: Sonny Stitt / Live at Ronnie Scott's – Sonny Stitt and the Dick Morrissey Quartet. Recorded May 1965
 1965: Live at Ronnie Scott's – Wes Montgomery
 1966: Blossom Time at Ronnie Scott's – Blossom Dearie
 1967: Sweet Blossom Dearie – Blossom Dearie
 1969: Volcano...Live at Ronnie's – Kenny Clarke/Francy Boland Big Band
 1969: Rue Chaptal...Live at Ronnie's – Kenny Clarke/Francy Boland Big Band
 1970: Somewhere in Soho (also released as Live at Ronnie Scott's Jazz Club) – Soft Machine
 1971: Dynasty (Live at Ronnie Scott's) – Stan Getz
 1972: Rich in London, aka Very Alive at Ronnie Scott's – Buddy Rich Big Band
 1974: Ella in London – Ella Fitzgerald
 1975: Lee Konitz Meets Warne Marsh Again - Lee Konitz and Warne Marsh
 1976: Livestock - Brand X
 1976: Symphony of Scorpions - Graham Collier
 1977: Ronnie Scott's Presents Sarah Vaughan Live – Sarah Vaughan
 1980: Complete Live at Ronnie Scott's 1980 – Bill Evans
 1980: Live at Ronnie Scott's, aka The Man from Planet Jazz – Buddy Rich Big Band
 1980: Live at Ronnie Scott's – Mike Carr and His Trio Featuring Jim Mullen and Harold Smith – Mike Carr
 1980: Blues for the Fisherman – The Milcho Leviev Quartet, featuring Art Pepper
 1980: True Blues – The Milcho Leviev Quartet, featuring Art Pepper
 1983: Live at Ronnie Scott's – Weekend
 1984: Live at Ronnie Scott's – Nina Simone. Recorded 17 November 1984.
 1986: Live at Ronnie Scott's – Chet Baker
 1986: Live at Ronnie Scott's – Chico Freeman
 1986: Live at Ronnie Scott's, London – Anita O'Day
 1988: Live at Ronnie Scott's – Curtis Mayfield
 1988: I Gotta Right to Sing (live at Ronnie Scott's) – Marion Montgomery
 1988: Live at Ronnie Scott's – Roy Ayers
 1989: The London Concert – George Russell's Living Time Orchestra
 1990: Live at Ronnie's – John Dankworth Big Band
 1990: Live at Ronnie Scott's – Taj Mahal
 1991: Felicidad – Irakere
 1992: 'S Wonderful – Elaine Delmar
 1992: Fourth World: Recorded live at Ronnie Scott's Club
 1992: Ghostsongs – Ian Shaw
 1994: Speed Trap – Peter King Quintet featuring Gerard Presencer
 1995: How Long Has This Been Going On – Van Morrison, Georgie Fame and Pee Wee Ellis. Recorded 3 May 1995.
 1995: A Change of Seasons – Dream Theater
 1997: Dolly Bird – Liane Carroll
 1998: Live at Ronnie Scott's – Shakatak
 1998: Soho Session – Peter Green Splinter Group
 2000: Ronnie Scott's Jazz House – Arturo Sandoval
 2002: Son of Dolly Bird – Liane Carroll
 2003: Live at Ronnie Scott's - Lisa Stansfield
 2004: Watts at Scott's – Charlie Watts Performing This Week...Live at Ronnie Scott's
 2005: MF Horn VI – Live at Ronnie's – Maynard Ferguson
 2006: Live at Ronnie Scott's – Jamie Cullum
 2007: Live at Ronnie Scott's – Jeff Beck
 2017: Live at Ronnie Scott's - John McLaughlin with The 4th Dimension
 2019: Weekend in London – George Benson

See also
Ronnie Scott
Thomas Gould (violinist)
List of jazz clubs

Further reading
 Ronnie Scott's Jazz Farrago – compilation of best features from Jazz At Ronnie Scott's magazine, Hampstead Press, 2008,
 Ronnie Scott, Some of My Best Friends are Blues'' (with Mike Hennessey). London: Northway Publications 2004. .
Ronnie Scott's Jazz Club interview at Allaboutjazz.com
 BBC Omnibus – Ronnie Scott and All That Jazz 1989

Industry interview with Nick Lewis, Head of Music & Promotions at Ronnie Scott's, March 2019.

References

External links

1959 establishments in England
Jazz clubs in London
Music venues in London
Soho, London
Chinatown, London